Vasile Lucaciu (January 21, 1852 – November 29, 1922) was a Romanian Greek-Catholic priest and an advocate of equal rights of Romanians with the Hungarians in Transylvania.

Biogeaphy
He was born in Apa, Szatmár County, the son of Mihai Lucaciu and Iuliana Toth. He went to school in his native village and then attended gymnasium in Baia Mare. For high school, he first went to Uzhhorod and then to the Jesuit school in Oradea.

His parish was in Șișești, Maramureș where he built a school and a church.

Lucaciu was a member of the National Romanian Party and a co-author of the Transylvanian Memorandum (1892). As a consequence, Vasile Lucaciu was tried for "homeland betrayal" in Kolozsvár/Cluj in May 1894 and sentenced to five years in prison. However he was released after one year.

In 1905, he was elected deputy for the Belényes/Beiuș constituency in the Hungarian Parliament.

In March 1917, Vasile Lucaciu was a member of a group of exiled Romanian Habsburg subjects who were sent as a delegation to the United States to campaign for Romania's cause. He died in 1922 in Satu Mare and was buried in Șișești.

Lucaciu is also known as the "Lion of Șișești". People can visit today his  in Șișești, as well as the school, both being now museums.

The Vasile Lucaciu National College in Baia Mare is named after him. A boulevard in Satu Mare and streets in Baia Mare, Bucharest, Ploiești, and Timișoara also bear his name.

References
 Alexandru Ciura, "Biografia părintelui Vasile Lucaciu" (Sibiu, 1928). 
 Florin Mirghesiu - "Iași - Washington via Siberia, Coreea, Japonia și Hawaii", in Magazin Istoric, no. 12, December 2004. 
 Gelu Neamțu, "Vasile Lucaciu și voluntarii români în armata Statelor Unite în primul război mondial (1917-1918)", in: AUDC ist., 2001.

1852 births
1922 deaths
People from Satu Mare County
Ethnic Romanian politicians in Transylvania
Members of the Chamber of Deputies (Romania)
Prisoners and detainees of Austria-Hungary
Romanian Greek-Catholic priests
Romanian prisoners and detainees